Statistics of Úrvalsdeild in the 1935 season.

Overview
It was contested by 4 teams, and Valur won the championship. KR's Þorsteinn Einarsson and Bjarni Ólafsson, as well as Valur's Magnús Bergsteinsson, were the joint top scorers with 3 goals each.

League standings

Results

References

Úrvalsdeild karla (football) seasons
Iceland
Iceland
Urvalsdeild